Parliamentary elections were held in the Federated States of Micronesia on 3 March 1981. All candidates for seats in Congress ran as independents.

References

Micronesia
1981 in the Federated States of Micronesia
Elections in the Federated States of Micronesia
Non-partisan elections